Karl Berger (born 13 June 1951) is a German former football player and coach who played as a forward.

External links
 

1951 births
Living people
German footballers
Association football forwards
Bundesliga players
2. Bundesliga players
VfB Stuttgart players
Karlsruher SC players
SC Fortuna Köln players
K.F.C. Winterslag players
K. Waterschei S.V. Thor Genk players
German football managers
FC Schaffhausen managers
FC Baden managers
German expatriate footballers
German expatriate football managers
German expatriate sportspeople in Belgium
Expatriate footballers in Belgium
German expatriate sportspeople in Switzerland
Expatriate footballers in Switzerland
Expatriate football managers in Switzerland